The Victorians may refer to:

Books
The Victorians, 1941 book by Mary Stocks
The Victorians: An Anthology, 1950 book edited by Geoffrey Grigson
The Victorians, 1960 book by Sir Charles Petrie, 3rd Baronet
The Victorians, 1966 book by Joan Evans (art historian)
The Victorians, 1978 book by Laurence Lerner
The Victorians: An Anthology of Poetry and Poetics, 2000 book edited by Valentine Cunningham
The Victorians, 2011 book by A. N. Wilson
The Victorians (Rees-Mogg book), 2019 book by Jacob Rees-Mogg

TV series
The Victorians, 2009 British documentary series

See also
Victorian (disambiguation)
Victorian People
Victorian era